, known mononymously as , is a Japanese drummer from Ishikari. In 2018, at age 8, she gained international attention for an online video in which she covered Led Zeppelin's "Good Times Bad Times", which was uploaded to Vimeo as her entry for the 2018 Hit Like a Girl contest. As of October 2019, the video has 3.2 million views and David Grohl, Ian Paice, and Robert Plant all praised the video and her drumming capabilities. She has stated that John Bonham, Chris Coleman, and Benny Greb are her favorite drummers and Rage Against the Machine her favorite band.

Childhood and career
Soma started drumming at age 2 and performing in concerts at age 4. In 2015, she began playing in her family's band, Kaneaiyoyoka, with her parents, Akifumi and Rie Soma. At age 6 during her kindergarten years, she released her first music CD. Soma and her family have discussed how Japan and its traditional school system has been stifling to her music career and aspirations, preventing her from playing drums during her school life because of her higher skill level than the other students. She also spoke out against the idea of collectivism in Japan that prevents individuality and the idea of any individual person standing out as unique.

Performances
When she was 8, she appeared as the youngest performer ever recorded at the Rising Sun Rock Festival and later at Summer Sonic Festival on the stage reserved for Fall Out Boy. She went on to be a guest drummer for Cyndi Lauper on her last tour day at the Tokyo Orchard Hall.

She has appeared twice on the American television talk show Ellen and in advertisements for sports apparel maker Nike, Italian luxury fashion brand Moncler and Japanese casual wear designer uniqlo. Her online videos have been viewed over 48 million times. She was listed by Newsweek Japan as one of the top 100 Japanese people that the world respects.

References

Child rock musicians
21st-century Japanese musicians
Living people
Japanese children
Japanese rock drummers
Musicians from Hokkaido
2009 births